Secret Queen Makers is a South Korean promotional web series produced for Lotte Duty Free Shop. It premiered online through Naver TV Cast and YouTube every Monday, Tuesday and Thursday starting from June 4 to June 19, 2018.

Synopsis 
A travel agent who lacks confidence in her appearance finds her hidden beauty with the help of six men met at Lotte Duty Free stores.

Cast 
Go Won-hee as Ahn Gong-joo
Lee Joon-gi as himself (Ep. 1, 6)
Hwang Chan-sung as himself (Ep. 1–2)
Leeteuk as himself (Ep. 2–3)
Hwang Chi-yeul as himself (Ep. 3–4)
Park Chanyeol as himself (Ep. 4–5)
Oh Se-hun as himself (Ep. 6–7)
Jin Hye-won as Wang Bit-na

List of episodes

Original soundtrack

References

South Korean web series
2018 web series debuts
2018 web series endings
Naver TV original programming
Television series by Zium Content